Trolltunga ("Troll tongue") is a rock formation situated about  above sea level in Ullensvang Municipality in Vestland county, Norway.

Popularity of the hike to Trolltunga and rock formation itself has exploded in recent years. The increased popularity has turned Trolltunga into a national icon and a major tourist attraction for the region. Until 2010, fewer than 800 people hiked to Trolltunga each year. In 2016 more than 80,000 people hiked the  round-trip from the village of Skjeggedal, making it one of Norway's most popular hikes.

This is a very challenging hike, at least 10 hours on rough terrain. There are no shelters on the hike route and no places to buy supplies. However, there is a plan to build a lodge roughly halfway where hikers can rest.

Geology
The cliff is part of the Precambrian bedrock and was formed during the Ice Age, approximately 10,000 years ago, when the edges of the glacier reached the cliff. The water from the glacier froze in the crevices of the mountain and eventually broke off large, angular blocks, which were later carried away with the glacier. Along the cliff itself, a gneiss, there continues to be deep cracks. The trail to Trolltunga also passes through the bedrock and washed slippery hillsides in the background also containing gneiss.

Access

The hike from the parking area to Trolltunga and back again is a  round-trip distance with a  gain in elevation, and it takes approximately 10–12 hours, including breaks.

Hiking trail 

Near the parking area at Skjeggedal there is a funicular called Mågelibanen (it is not in operation). The trail to Trolltunga begins here, on the left side of the funicular. It is marked with red Ts painted in the terrain, and signs along the route that marks the distance left to Trolltunga and to the starting point at Skjeggedal.

From here the track surfaces slightly out before it gets steep again, rising another  up from Gryteskaret to Trombåskåret. This section is the steepest part on this hike. But in recent years this section have been improved by Nepalese sherpas, making it easier to traverse.

After this  steep climb from the parking area, the next section slopes down towards Store Floren. The trail continues over Hesteflåene and the dried out river Endåno, before it gets steeper up to Endanuten and crosses the dried river to Tyssestrengene.

Alternative starting point 
In 2017, a new toll road up the steep hillside to Mågelitopp opened to the public. It allows vehicles to access the plateau at Måglitopp. It does not require a 4x4 vehicle.  Due to limited parking the maximum capacity here is 30 cars per day. The road opens each day during the season at 6:00 AM, and closes when the first 30 cars have entered the gate. Online reservations are possible and parking here costs  The road is also open to hikers, as an alternative to the regular starting point at Skjeggedal.

Terrain

The route to Trolltunga goes through high mountain terrain with creeks, streams, boulders, mud puddles, marshes, and water at several spots on the hike.

From late-September to June the terrain is normally covered with ice and snow. After a hard winter it can be snow at Trolltunga even during the summer season.

Seasons and climate 
Trolltunga is accessible for experienced hikers and guided groups from mid-June to mid-September, depending on when the snow melts in the Spring. The season for guided trips with snowshoes or skis starts in March.

Trolltunga is located in a region with a mild and humid coastal climate. During summer and autumn the weather conditions often change quickly – from blue sky to wind, rain and dense fog. Check the weather forecast and ask locals about what kind of weather to expect before you go hiking.

Due to the long distance, hikers to Trolltunga need to start before 10:00 AM in the summer season[2]  to get home before it gets dark and cold. In September it is recommended to start 8:00 AM at latest, since it gets darker earlier in the evening.

Degree of difficulty 
The Norwegian Trekking Association classify the hike as "challenging", requiring good endurance as well as proper hiking boots and equipment.

Safety
Thousands of tourists visit Trolltunga during the four summer months, a number which has greatly increased from 500 per year to 80,000 between 2009 and 2016. No safety railing has been constructed on the edge of the cliff so as not to harm the natural beauty of the cliff, although a few small metal hooks have been installed as footholds to climb down to the rock.

On 5 September 2015, a 24-year-old Australian woman fell to her death off Trolltunga. It is believed to be the first recorded death from a fall there.

There are widely publicised photos of people hanging off the cliff or doing a hand stand on it. Most often they are manipulated. The elite climber Magnus Midtbø suspended himself from Trolltunga wearing a safety harness, but a version where the rope was erased has been spread in media.

The approach to and retreat from Trolltunga is a demanding hike, and 10–12 hours are needed for the round trip. In later years there have been up to 40 rescue actions annually. Surprisingly not because of the dangerous cliff, but due to the demanding hike back to Tyssedal. People get lost in fog or get injured during the hike or don't have the endurance for such a demanding hike.

It is planned to build a lodge halfway between Trolltunga and Tyssedal, which will provide accommodation for hikers en route from Trolltunga.

Surrounding landscape 
The cliff overlooks the valleys of the Hardanger region. The mountains surrounding the cliff reach heights of up to 1500 meters. Some of the hilltops have plains which are interspersed with lakes. Patches of snow are present in some areas, even in the summer months. Due to heavy use by tourists, the trail to Trolltunga quickly turns to mud after a rain in the summer.

In popular culture 
A movie song called Amali thumali (from 02:47m to 03:19m and from 04:57m to 04:59m ) from the 2011 blockbuster Tamil language movie Ko (film) features the lead couples dancing on the top of the troll tongue rock formation at Trolltunga.

Gallery

See also

 Kjerag
 Kjeragbolten
 Preikestolen
 Trollgaren
 De syv søstre
 Trollpikken
 Trollveggen
 Trollstigen
 Besseggen
 List of waterfalls
 National parks of Norway

References

External links
 Trolltunga.com Official site
 Hiking Trolltunga from Odda Tourist Office
 About Trolltunga from Fjord Norway, the official tourist board of Western Norway
 Trolltunga Road Information about the toll road from Skjeggedal to Mågelitopp

Ullensvang
Landforms of Vestland
Cliffs of Norway
Rock formations of Norway